Jeunesse Sportive de Talangaï is a Congolese football club based in Brazzaville.

The club currently plays in Congo Premier League.

In 2007 the team has won the Coupe du Congo.

Honours
Congo Premier League: 0
Coupe du Congo: 1
 2007.

Super Coupe du Congo: 0

Performance in CAF competitions
CAF Confederation Cup: 1 appearance
2007 – Preliminary Round
2008 – Preliminary Round

Stadium
Currently the team plays at the 50000 capacity Stade Alphonse Massemba-Débat.

References

External links
 Soccerway

Football clubs in the Republic of the Congo
Sports clubs in Brazzaville